Saint-Damase, Quebec may refer to:
Saint-Damase, Bas-Saint-Laurent, Quebec, in La Matapédia Regional County Municipality
Saint-Damase, Montérégie, Quebec, in Les Maskoutains Regional County Municipality
Saint-Damase-de-L'Islet, in L'Islet Regional County Municipality